André Haschker (born 16 February 1983 in Dresden) is a professional squash player who represents Germany. He reached a career-high world ranking of World No. 135 in May 2013.

References

External links 
 
 
  

German male squash players
Living people
1983 births
Sportspeople from Dresden